1554 Yugoslavia, provisional designation , is a stony Eunomian asteroid from the middle region of the asteroid belt, approximately  in diameter. It was discovered by Serbian astronomer Milorad Protić at Belgrade Astronomical Observatory, Serbia, on 6 September 1940. It was named for the former country of Yugoslavia.

Orbit and classification 

The asteroid is a member of the Eunomia family, a large group of mostly stony S-type asteroids and the most prominent family in the intermediate main-belt. It orbits the Sun in the central main-belt at a distance of 2.1–3.1 AU once every 4 years and 3 months (1,548 days). Its orbit has an eccentricity of 0.20 and an inclination of 12° with respect to the ecliptic. Its observation arc begins 4 year prior to its official discovery observation, with a precovery taken at Nice Observatory in 1936.

Physical characteristics 

From 2007 to 2012, several photometric lightcurve observations of Yugoslavia established a well-defined rotation period of 3.89 hours with a brightness variation between 0.64 and 0.74 magnitude.

According to the surveys carried out by the Japanese Akari satellite and NASA's Wide-field Infrared Survey Explorer with its subsequent NEOWISE mission, Yugoslavia measures between 14.73 and 21.39 kilometers in diameter, and its surface has an albedo between 0.070 and 0.269. The Collaborative Asteroid Lightcurve Link assumes an albedo of 0.21 – derived from 15 Eunomia, the family's largest member and namesake – and calculates a diameter of 15.94 kilometers with an absolute magnitude of 11.3.

Naming 

This minor planet was named after the former country of Yugoslavia. The official  was published by the Minor Planet Center on 30 January 1964.

References

External links 
 Asteroid Lightcurve Database (LCDB), query form (info )
 Dictionary of Minor Planet Names, Google books
 Asteroids and comets rotation curves, CdR – Observatoire de Genève, Raoul Behrend
 Discovery Circumstances: Numbered Minor Planets (1)-(5000) – Minor Planet Center
 
 

001554
Discoveries by Milorad B. Protić
Named minor planets
19400906